This is the discography of Stat Quo, an American rapper/producer from Atlanta, Georgia.

Albums

Studio albums

Independent albums

Mixtapes
 Underground Atlanta Volumes 1-4 (2003-2006)
 Street Status (2005)
 Grown Man Music (with DJ Drama) (2006)
 Big Business (with Chamillionaire) (2006)
 Zone 3 (with DJ Whoo Kid) (2006)
 Road to Statlanta (with DJ Smallz) (2007)
 Now or Never (with DJ Noodles) (2007)
 Statistically Speaking (with DJ Nik Bean & DJ Felli Fel) (2008)
 The South Got Somethin to Say (2008)
 The Bailout (2008)
 Hip Hop is My Life (with DJ LRM) (2009)
 Quo City (2009)
 Checks & Balance (2009)
 The Invisible Man (2009)
 The Status Report (with DJ Black Bill Gates) (2009)
 2010 (2010)

Singles

Guest appearances

References

Discographies of American artists
Hip hop discographies